In number theory, the Selberg sieve is a technique for estimating the size of "sifted sets" of positive integers which satisfy a set of conditions which are expressed by congruences.  It was developed by Atle Selberg in the 1940s.

Description
In terms of sieve theory the Selberg sieve is of combinatorial type: that is, derives from a careful use of the inclusion–exclusion principle.  Selberg replaced the values of the Möbius function which arise in this by a system of weights which are then optimised to fit the given problem.  The result gives an upper bound for the size of the sifted set.

Let  be a set of positive integers  and let  be a set of primes. Further let  denote  itself. The object of the sieve is to estimate

We assume that |Ad| may be estimated by

where f is a multiplicative function and X   =   |A|.  Let the function g be obtained from f by Möbius inversion, that is

where μ is the Möbius function.  
Put

Then

It is often useful to estimate  by the bound

Applications
 The Brun–Titchmarsh theorem on the number of primes in arithmetic progression;
 The number of n ≤ x such that n is coprime to φ(n) is asymptotic to e−γ x / log log log (x) .

References
 
 
 
 
 
 

Sieve theory